The 1932 United States presidential election in Wisconsin was held on November 8, 1932 as part of the 1932 United States presidential election. State voters chose 12 electors to the Electoral College, who voted for president and vice president.

Background
Wisconsin had since the decline of the Populist movement been substantially a one-party state dominated by the Republican Party. The Democratic Party became entirely uncompetitive outside certain German Catholic counties adjoining Lake Michigan as the upper classes, along with the majority of workers who followed them, completely fled from William Jennings Bryan's agrarian and free silver sympathies. As Democratic strength weakened severely after 1894 – although the state did develop a strong Socialist Party to provide opposition to the GOP – Wisconsin developed the direct Republican primary in 1903 and this ultimately created competition between the "League" under Robert M. La Follette, and the conservative "Regular" faction.

The beginning of the 1910s would see a minor Democratic revival as many La Follette progressives endorsed Woodrow Wilson, but this flirtation would not be long-lasting as Wilson's "Anglophile" foreign policies were severely opposed by Wisconsin's largely German- and Scandinavian-American populace. Subsequent federal elections saw the Midwest desert the Democratic Party even more completely due to supposed preferential treatment of Southern farmers, and in Wisconsin there were never more than three Democrats in the state legislature (and none in the State Senate) between 1921 and 1929.

The Great Depression, apart from providing a revitalized Socialist Party and small Democratic gains – did not affect the state's politics, which continued to be dominated by the La Follette family, substantially. Nonetheless, given that that family had never endorsed incumbent GOP President Herbert Hoover, the national Republican Party was pleased when a conservative, Walter J. Kohler Sr., won the gubernatorial nomination.

Vote
Interviews at the beginning of October said that with the aid of La Follette forces Roosevelt would carry the state, and a poll a week into that month had Democratic nominee and New York Governor Franklin D. Roosevelt ahead of incumbent President Hoover by more than two-to-one. When the Progressive leader Robert M. La Follette, Jr. announced his support for Roosevelt and the state Democratic ticket, and said Hoover was a "reactionary" and "wrong on every issue". Later polls in October only served to increase Roosevelt's advantage, and in the end he carried Wisconsin by more than two-to-one despite a strong vote for Socialist Party candidate Norman Thomas, who won over twelve percent in Milwaukee County. Wisconsin would prove Thomas' strongest state, although he did not receive half the percentage gained by Eugene V. Debs in 1920.

Roosevelt won every county except the two Yankee strongholds of Rock and Walworth, which had been Calvin Coolidge's best counties when Robert M. La Follette, Sr. carried his home state in 1924.

With his win in Wisconsin, Roosevelt became the first Democratic presidential candidate since Woodrow Wilson in 1912 to carry the state and the first since Franklin Pierce in 1852 to win the state with a majority of the popular vote (Wilson's win and Grover Cleveland's in 1892 were only pluralities).

Results

Results by county

See also
 United States presidential elections in Wisconsin

References

Wisconsin
1932
1932 Wisconsin elections